David Jay Perry Airport is a town-owned public-use airport in Goldsby, a town in McClain County, Oklahoma, United States. The airport is located near the interchange of I-35 and State Highway 74. The airport was originally built by the US Navy in 1943 as an octagonal-shaped Outlying Landing Field serving Naval Air Station Norman, OK, six miles to the north. After the war, ownership of the field was transferred to the city of Goldsby, undergoing several improvements and expansions over the following decades.

Facilities and aircraft 
It has two runways—one designated 17/35 with a 1,803×60 ft (550×18 m) asphalt surface, and one designated 13/31 with a 3,006×60 ft (916×18 m) concrete surface.

References

External links 

Airports in Oklahoma
Buildings and structures in McClain County, Oklahoma